Myrna Braza (born 3 November 1983 in Flakka, Bergen, Norway) is a Norwegian singer, composer, and the younger sister of dancer and singer Belinda Braza.

Career 
Braza is a graduate at Bergen Katedralskole, where she got her Examen artium in 2000. She has repeatedly been cited as the soul queen in Bergen. With her distinctive, soulful voice and her impresses charisma on stage, her music is best described as a mix of soul, funk and pop. She released her debut solo album Free As a Bird in 2009, and also has numerous singles and music videos. She is also known for being an excellent live artist and have played several concerts at small and large venues and festivals in Norway and England.

Braza has been opening artist for the world-renowned soul artists Raphael Saadiq and Dwele. She has collaborated on several Norwegian and international releases and collaborated with artists such as The Loch Ness Mouse, Nicki Noelle, Kleen, Kahuun, Aché, Son Of Light, Double D, D-Techs, Spetakkel, LidoLido, Narrowhead, Marc Farrano, Hanne Vatnøy and Faith Circus. She has also sung with Noora Noor, and contributed the song "Gett Off" on Christer Falck's tribute disc to Prince, Shockadelica. Braza has performed at Nattjazz Vorspiel, Quart Festival and ByLarm. She also has participated on the TV shown Beat for Beat at NRK with e.g. Christian Ingebrigtsen from A1 and Lydverket.

Discography

Solo albums 
2009: Free As a Bird (Frö by Löft)
2013: Moments (Frö by Löft), EP
2016: Story of I (Frö by Löft)
2022: Fakker opp (Frö by Löft)

Collaborations 
With Kahuun – Kai Stoltz
2007: Bontelabo (Bagpak Records), feat. Myrna Braza

References

External links 

Free As A Bird – Myrna Braza on YouTube
Still Waters – Myrna Braza on YouTube

Norwegian composers
Musicians from Bergen
Living people
1983 births
People educated at the Bergen Cathedral School
Norwegian people of Filipino descent
21st-century Norwegian singers
21st-century Norwegian women singers